Orpe is a surname. Notable people with the surname include: 

Michelle Orpe, British TV presenter, columnist and poker personality
Tom Orpe (1900–?), English footballer

See also
Oppe